The 2017–18 Jordan FA Cup was the 38th season of the national football competition of Jordan. The winners of the competition earned a spot in the 2019 AFC Cup.

The competition started on 25 September 2017.

Group stage

Group A

Group B

Group C

Group D

Semi-finals

1st leg

2nd leg

Final

References

External links
Soccerway

Jordan FA Cup seasons
Jordan
2017–18 in Jordanian football